The 2011–12 Laredo Bucks season was the 10th season of the Central Hockey League (CHL) franchise in Laredo, Texas.

Off-season
It was announced during the off-season that Serge Dube would be the new head coach replacing Terry Ruskowski.

Regular season

Conference standings

Awards and records

Awards

Milestones

Transactions
The Bucks have been involved in the following transactions during the 2011–12 season.

Roster
Updated September 16, 2011.

See also
 2011–12 CHL season

References

L
L